The Illinois Subdivision is a railroad line owned and operated by CSX Transportation in the U.S. states of Indiana and Illinois. The line runs from Washington, Indiana, west to East St. Louis, Illinois, along a former Baltimore and Ohio Railroad line.

At its east end, the Illinois Subdivision becomes the Indiana Subdivision. At its west end in East St. Louis, near the west end of the St. Louis Line Subdivision, it meets the Terminal Railroad Association of St. Louis. Along the way, the line intersects the CE&D Subdivision at Vincennes, Indiana.

History
The line, built by the Ohio and Mississippi Railroad, was completed in 1857. It passed to the Baltimore and Ohio Railroad and CSX via leases and mergers.

In the summer of 2015, the Illinois Subdivision line was cut in Caseyville, Illinois, and just west of Flora, Illinois. This marked the temporary closure of the line from Flora west. A plastic manufacturer and three grain buyers in Richland and Lawrence counties continue to have access to the line with trains from the east. (Update 9/18/21) It marks over 5 years since the Illinois Subdivision's shut down from Flora, Illinois and to O'Fallon, Illinois. The future of this once action packed line is now facing an uncertain fate. As CSX Transportation has no plans to reactivate or to even have any future plans on this line.

External links
http://ilsubdivisionrailroad.wordpress.com

References

CSX Transportation lines
Rail infrastructure in Indiana
Rail infrastructure in Illinois
Baltimore and Ohio Railroad lines